Useful Island is an island 3.2 km (2 miles) west of Rongé Island, with a string of rocks between, lying in Gerlache Strait off the west coast of Graham Land.  It was discovered by the Belgian Antarctic Expedition, 1897–99, under Adrien de Gerlache.  The name appears on a chart based upon a 1927 survey by Discovery Investigations personnel on the RRS Discovery.

Geography 
The bedrock is Mesozoic granite.

Bird Life 
Gentoo and chinstrap penguins have rookeries on the top of the island.

See also 
 List of Antarctic and sub-Antarctic islands

Islands of Graham Land
Danco Coast